Vaculík (feminine Vaculíková) is a Czech surname, an archaic diminutive of the name Václav. Notable people include:

 Kristina Vaculik, Canadian artistic gymnast
 Ludvík Vaculík, Czech writer and journalist
 Lukáš Vaculík, Czech actor
 Lukáš Vaculík, Czech footballer
 Lukáš Vaculík, Czech skier
 Martin Vaculík, Slovak speedway rider
 Ondřej Vaculík, Czech ski-jumper
 Richie Vaculik, Australian mixed martial artist
 Silvia Vaculíková, Slovak photographer
 Tereza Vaculíková, Czech freestyle skier

Czech-language surnames